Romblon, officially the Municipality of Romblon,  is a 3rd class municipality and capital of the province of Romblon, Philippines. According to the 2020 census, it has a population of 40,554 people.

The town comprises the entire Romblon Island, one of the three major islands of Romblon province aside from Sibuyan Island and Tablas Island. As the capital of the province, it is also the seat of the Provincial Government. Its natives mostly speak Romblomanon or Ini language.

Romblon is known for its local marble industry and is the second biggest producer of the mineral in the country. It also a tourist destination because of its unspoiled beaches and Spanish-era twin forts.

History

Early history
The first inhabitants of Romblon were Negritos tribes of Panay and Mindoro Mangyan tribes. The discovery of hanging coffins and artistic material in caves of the island of Banton demonstrates the existence of a rich and ancient civilization and Aboriginal culture.

The islands were first visited by Spanish conquistador Martin de Goiti in late 1569, and were thereafter organized by the Spanish into encomiendas. The encomienda of Donblon (Romblon), established on April 24, 1571, was granted to Don Gonzalo Riquel. In the first census done by Spanish navigator Miguel de Loarca in 1582, Romblon Island was shown to have 240 residents engaged in wax gathering. At this time, Miguel de Loarca recorded the island's name as "Lomlon" or "Doblon". In the local Visayan dialect, the word means a bird warming an egg in its nest.  It was also known as Domblon before the present name was adopted.

In 1631, during the term of Spanish Governor-General Juan Niño de Tabora, Romblon was established as a pueblo, making it one of the two oldest settlements in the province, the other being Banton located in the north of the province. In 1635, the island of Romblon was evangelized by Spanish Recollect fathers and became a dependency of the Captaincy General of the Philippines. Their fortified church is the present cathedral of Romblon. It received its first Spanish missionaries in the 17th century. During the 17th and 18th centuries, it was often ravaged by Moros. Two forts were erected by the Spanish, San Andrés and Santiago.

It was organized into a Comandancia (a province or district under military control) by the Spanish in 1853.

Modern history
In 1901, the American occupation saw the establishment of a civilian government in the town. Ten new barrios were created while three existing barrios were also abolished. These include Aglomiom which was merged to Sablayan due to its small population, Embarcacion which was attached again to El Pueblo or Poblacion and the inland barrio of Cogon which was reorganized and split into five barrios of Tambac, Ilauran, Macalas, Lamao, and Agbaluto (referred collectively as TIMLA, from its initial letters) while barrio Alfonso XIII was renamed Li-o.

The 10 additional barrios were Bagacay, Agbudia, Agtongo, Embarcacion, Maria Cristina (renamed as Sawang) and the five new TIMLA barrios. These barrios aside from TIMLA were Agtongo which was created into a separate barrio in 1916 taken from Cajimos while in 1918 those engaged in maritime industry which were designated separately as distinct barrio known as Embarcacion was annexed again to barrio Poblacion or El Pueblo in 1939.   Agbudia was the last barrio to be created taken from Guimpingan in 1939. Meanwhile, the two barrios Majabangbaybay and Sogod, located in Tablas island, were returned to Badajoz (now San Agustin), abolished as independent barrios and attached as sitios of barrio Guinpuc-an (Carmen) in 1901.

During World War II, an American force landed in the island on March 11, 1945, and liberated it from the occupying Japanese forces. By March 18, the entire province was liberated from the Japanese. A monument located near the beach in Sawang commemorates this.

The island barrio of Nagoso was renamed Cobrador in 1960 and the urban barangay of Poblacion was split into four separate barangays, named simply as Barangays 1, 2, 3, and 4 in 1975.

On March 25, 2018, the Sandiganbayan, a special appellate collegial court that tries graft and corruption cases, affirmed its ruling sentencing Romblon mayor Mariano Mateo, former mayor Leo Mérida and eight other former local officials to 10 years in prison. The ruling was in connection with the alleged anomalous procurement of a heavy equipment. The case, which was filed in 2010, stemmed from the municipal government's purchase of a backhoe amounting to P13.95 million in November 2005 without public bidding. At the time, Mérida was mayor and Mateo was councilor. The court said witnesses testified that the backhoe was not used for the purpose for which it was purchased.

Geography

The municipality consists primarily of Romblon Island, as well as the smaller Alad, Cobrador, and Logbon islands, to the northwest, each of which are their own barangays. The municipality proper is situated along the coast of Romblon Bay, a natural harbor and safe haven for ships passing in the area during inclement weather.

Barangays
Romblon is politically subdivided into 31 barangays.

Climate

Romblon falls under Type III of the Corona climatic classification system which was devised in 1920. It is characterized by no pronounced wet and dry seasons. Generally, the wet season is from June to November and sometimes extends up to December when the southwest monsoon is predominant. The dry season is from January to May but is sometimes interrupted by erratic rainfall. Habagat monsoon winds pass through the province from June to October while northeasterly winds or Amihan blows through the islands from December to February.

Demographics 

Romblomanons are the indigenous inhabitants of Romblon. They are part of the wider Visayan ethnolinguistic group, who constitute the largest Filipino ethnolinguistic group. In 2015, there were 38,758 people living in Romblon. Most Romblomanons speak Ini, one of the three languages in the province after Asi and Onhan.

Economy

Romblon's economy relies much on the local marble industry. Marble is the most significant mineral deposit of Romblon and is the most renowned product of the province. The province is the second biggest provincial marble producer of the country next to Bulacan. Romblon marble is of very high quality and comes in shades of white, green, pink, red and black. The Mines and Geosciences Bureau has estimated that Romblon is endowed with about 150 million metric tons of marble. At current rates of extraction, the supply may last for three more centuries. Tablas Island is also believed to have vast reserves of marble.

Marble quarrying and processing are major activities in Romblon. Among the most common marble products are categorized into the following: novelty items (gifts, ashtray, table bars), furniture (dining tables, baptismal fonts) and construction materials (tiles, balusters, marble chips). Aside from marble quarrying and processing, tourism, fishing and coconut farming are also basic livelihood sources in the island.

Transportation

By sea
The main transportation link to Romblon is through RORO vessels. Currently, there are RORO vessels from Montenegro Lines, 2GO Travel, Navios Shipping Lines and Starhorse Shipping that dock in the town weekly from the ports of Batangas and Lucena. Travel time usually takes about six to seven hours. RORO vessels also travel directly from Batangas to Odiongan, and from there, travelers can ride a jeepney to the port of San Agustin where they can catch a ferry or motorized outrigger boat to Romblon.

By air
The closest airport with active airline service is Tugdan Airport in the town of Alcantara in the neighboring island of Tablas. Since December 2016, only Cebu Pacific has flights to the airport, with four flights weekly from Manila. From Alcantara, Romblon can be reached in 3–4 hours by jeepney and an hour by motorized boats or 40 minutes by ferry from San Agustin.

Going around
The island municipality is connected through the circumferential Romblon-Cogon-Sablayan Road as well as through a network of shorter roads. Modes of transportation available throughout the island include jeepneys, tricycles, cycle rickshaws locally known as pedicabs, and motorcycle taxis locally known as habal-habal.

Tourism 

The capital town of Romblon has a number of tourist places, which include:
 St. Joseph's Cathedral and Belfry: One of the oldest Roman Catholic Church is located in barrio Poblacion. It was constructed for the Recollect Fathers between 1640 and 1726 by talented local artisans using coral blocks and bricks.
 Fuente de Belen: Located across the municipal hall, Fuente de Belen is a water fountain erected in 1864 by Eduardo Asuero. It is the source of fresh water for Romblon during the Spanish colonial period. Atop the fountain is an image of the Blessed Virgin Mary.
 Old Municipal Building: Built out of coral limestone during the Spanish colonial era, it housed the cuartel or headquarters of the local Guardia Civil. Retaining the old architecture of the building, the municipal hall is still used to house government offices and the municipal jail.
 Bishop's Palace or Villa del Mar: Located in barangay Lonos, it serves as the official residence of the Bishop of Romblon. It was constructed out of clay bricks by the first bishop of Romblon, Msgr. Nicolas Mondejar
 Talipasak Beach Resort: It is located 13 kilometers from town in barangay Ginablan. Activities include swimming, snorkeling, beach combing, and island hopping.
Tiamban Beach: Located some 5 kilometers from the town proper, this fine white sand beach in barangay Lonos stretches to about 250 meters.
Forts San Andres and Santiago: Twin Spanish forts constructed out of coral blocks and bricks between 1644 and 1573, which overlook the whole town and harbor at 156 feet above sea level. These served as a bastion to protect the people against Muslim raiders and Dutch pirates.
Marble Beach Resort: Located in Barangay Ginablan.
Bonbon Beach: Located five kilometers away from town proper this shoreline in Barangay Lonos is covered with fine white sand and features a gradually sloping ocean floor free of sea grass and sharp stones.
Simbahan Cave: Located in barangay Cobrador, it is the largest natural cave in the islands and believed to be an ancient burial ground as manifested by pottery and ancient works of arts found inside.
Cobrador Beach: This beach is located in the eastern side of the islet and has fine white sand and crushed corals.
Romblon Harbor: It has offered shelter for sea vessels since Spanish colonial period. Lying off the bay is a sunken galleon and the wreck of a Japanese battleship.
Buena Suerte Resort: A nature resort with a swimming pool located in Barangay Tambac.
Marble quarries and factories: Romblon's marble comes in a spectrum of shades ranging from white to black with a gamut of in-between tints like mottled white, tiger white, onyx and jade.

Government

Pursuant to Chapter II, Title II, Book III of Republic Act 7160 or the Local Government Code of 1991, the municipal government is composed of a mayor (alkalde), a vice mayor (bise alkalde) and members (kagawad) of the legislative branch Sangguniang Bayan alongside a secretary to the said legislature, all of which are elected to a three-year term and are eligible to run for three consecutive terms. The incumbent mayor is Gerard Montojo and the vice mayor is Mariano "Anoy" Mateo.

 Died in office. 
 Served in acting capacity. 
 Resigned.

Provincial government
Romblon is also the capital of Romblon Province, and as such, the Romblon Provincial Capitol Complex, where the governor, the vice governor, and the Sangguniang Panlalawigan takes office, is situated in the municipality in Barangay Capaclan.

References

External links

 [ Philippine Standard Geographic Code]
 Romblon, Romblon Profile - Cities and Municipalities Competitive Index
 Philippine Census Information
 Local Governance Performance Management System
 Tourist Attractions - Romblon, Romblon Provincial Government of Romblon website. Retrieved on April 1, 2013
 Romblon Island at OpenStreetMap

Municipalities of Romblon
Provincial capitals of the Philippines
Island municipalities in the Philippines